The Solo Angeles Club de Motociclistas are an outlaw motorcycle club that was formed in Tijuana, Mexico in 1959. The club's insignia is simply a chopper-style motorcycle. The club does an annual charity run where they deliver toys to poor children in Tijuana.

References

Additional sources

External links
 

1959 establishments in Mexico
Outlaw motorcycle clubs
Tijuana
Clubs and societies in Mexico